The Prussian P 4 was a derivative of the P 4.1 (Hanover variant) and the second superheated steam locomotive in the world.

Design 
The engine was based on that of the Class P 4.1 that had Hanomag had produced in large numbers since 1892. It had slightly larger wheels and, due to its new design, significantly fewer heating tubes. The superheater and the steam engine were entirely independent designs.

Service and preservation 
In 1898 a one-off was delivered by Hanomag to the Prussian state railways. The economy of the superheated system was soon proven in 1899 by the engine during trial runs from Kassel. Apart from a short stay at Halle the engine was assigned to Kassel as Cassel 131 and, from 1906, as P 4 Cassel 1846. In 1921, after the First World War, the engine was mothballed, along with many other machines of similar class. With its sectioned boiler the P 4 stood for a long time in the Transport and Construction Museums, part of Museum of the Present at Hamburger Bahnhof in Berlin.

See also 
 Prussian state railways
 List of Prussian locomotives and railbuses
 List of preserved steam locomotives in Germany

References 

 

P 04
4-4-0 locomotives
Passenger locomotives
Railway locomotives introduced in 1898
Standard gauge locomotives of Germany
2′B h2 locomotives